Black Tuesday is a 1954 American crime drama film noir directed by Hugo Fregonese and starring Edward G. Robinson, Peter Graves and Jean Parker. The supporting cast features Milburn Stone, Warren Stevens, Jack Kelly and Russell Johnson.

Plot
A violent con, Vincent Canelli, escapes prison on the night of his execution.  With the help of a phony newspaper reporter and Canelli's girlfriend, the con takes along five hostages, including a priest.

Another inmate, Peter Manning, is taken along because Canelli wants the money Manning hid before going to jail.  Manning is injured badly in the escape and leaves a bloody trail.

The gang ends up at a hideout where they're surrounded by police.  Canelli threatens to kill hostages if he's not given safe passage and murders a kidnapped prison guard to make his point.  Manning is horrified and ends up killing Canelli, then giving up himself and the others to police.

Cast
 Edward G. Robinson as Canelli
 Jean Parker as Hatti
 Peter Graves as Manning
 Milburn Stone as Father Slocum
 Warren Stevens as Joey Stewart
 Sylvia Findley as Ellen Norris 
 Jack Kelly as Carson
 James Bell as John Norris 
 Vic Perrin as Dr. Hart
 Russell Johnson as Howard Sloane

Reception
The New York Times gave the film a positive review, writing, "...it's good to have a reminder that Hollywood still holds top priority in the gangster melodrama field. Take Black Tuesday, which accompanied the Palace's new stage bill yesterday, with Edward G. Robinson playing his old, snariing, savage self.  We hastily add that this medium-budget United Artists offering, produced by Robert Goldstein, by no means reprises the sterling tradition of those cops-and-killers yarns about our urban jungles of the roaring Twenties, when the Robinsons, Cagneys and Munis cut their fangs. However, purely on a surface level, the new entry can snuggle up to them quite respectably ... In contrast to Mr. Robinson's wholesale sputtering, the supporting cast of comparatively unfamiliar faces are brought, one by one, into impersonal but perceptive focus. And most of them shine convincingly."

Film historian and critic Alain Silver said of the film, "When society at large is threatened, the psychopaths presented tend to be of the most violent ilk, as if to justify social repression by exaggerating the threat.  Edward G. Robinson as gangster Vincent Canelli in Black Tuesday... exhibits a sadistic bent rivaled only by James Cagney in White Heat."

References

External links
 
 
 
 

Films directed by Hugo Fregonese
1954 films
American crime thriller films
American black-and-white films
Film noir
United Artists films
Films scored by Paul Dunlap
1950s crime thriller films
1950s English-language films
1950s American films